Charles Mitchell "Dolo" Coker (November 16, 1927 – April 13, 1983) was a jazz pianist and composer who recorded four albums for Xanadu Records and extensively as a sideman, for artists like Sonny Stitt, Gene Ammons, Lou Donaldson, Art Pepper, Philly Joe Jones, and Dexter Gordon.

Biography
Charles Mitchell "Dolo" Coker was born in Hartford, Connecticut on November 16, 1927, raised in both Philadelphia and Florence, South Carolina. The first musical instruments Coker played in childhood were the C-melody and alto saxophones, learning them at a school in Camden, South Carolina. By the age of thirteen he was starting to play piano. Coker moved to Philadelphia, where he studied piano at the Landis School of Music and at Orenstein's Conservatory. Coker also played some shows on piano for Jimmy Heath while in Philadelphia.

He was also a member of the Frank Morgan Quartet (with Flip Greene on bass and Larance Marable on drums).

Coker did not record his own album as a leader until 1976, when he recorded his debut Dolo! with Blue Mitchell, Harold Land, Leroy Vinnegar and Frank Butler. That following day he recorded California Hard for Xanadu Records, with Art Pepper replacing Harold Land on sax. Following California Hard were Third Down and All Alone. He continued to work as a sideman for other artists until he died of cancer at the age of fifty-five on April 13, 1983.

Coker's nickname is sometimes misspelt "Dodo" in sleeve notes and books on jazz.

Discography

As leader/co-leader

As sideman
With Frank Butler
The Stepper (Xanadu, 1977)
Wheelin' and Dealin' (Xanadu, 1978)
With Junior CookJunior's Cookin' (Jazzland, 1961)
With Sonny CrissCrisscraft (Muse, 1975)Out of Nowhere (Muse, 1976)
With Harry EdisonEdison's Lights (Pablo, 1976)Simply Sweets (Pablo, 1978) with Eddie "Lockjaw" Davis
With Teddy EdwardsFeelin's (Muse, 1974)
With Dexter GordonThe Resurgence of Dexter Gordon (Jazzland, 1960)
With Philly Joe JonesShowcase (Riverside, 1959)
With Les McCannLes McCann Sings (Pacific Jazz, 1961)
With Art PepperIntensity (Contemporary, 1963)
With Red RodneySuperbop (Muse, 1974)
With Sonny Stitt37 Minutes and 48 Seconds with Sonny Stitt (Roost, 1957)I Remember Bird'' (Catalyst, 1977)

References

Bebop pianists
American jazz pianists
American male pianists
American jazz composers
American male jazz composers
1927 births
1983 deaths
Musicians from Hartford, Connecticut
Xanadu Records artists
20th-century American composers
20th-century American pianists
Jazz musicians from Connecticut
20th-century American male musicians
20th-century jazz composers